The 1932–33 Ljubljana Subassociation League was the 14th season of the Ljubljana Subassociation League. I. SSK Maribor won the league for the second time.

Final table

References

External links
Football Association of Slovenia 

Slovenian Republic Football League seasons
Yugo
2
Football
Football